Ensisi Valley is a suburb and housing area in the North-West of Port Moresby, the capital city of Papua New Guinea.

Suburbs of Port Moresby